XHCNA-FM is a radio station on 100.1 FM in Culiacán, Sinaloa. It is owned by Grupo ACIR and carries its Match FM pop format.

History
XHCNA received its concession on October 1, 1980. It was owned by Leonardo Julián López Saínz Puga. ACIR owned the station by the 1990s.

Radio Disney Culiacán went on air September 29, 2014, remaining in the pop format but replacing ACIR's own Digital brand.

Match
On December 26, 2019, Disney and ACIR announced they were mutually ending their relationship, which had covered twelve Mexican cities. Ten of the twelve Radio Disney stations, including XHCNA, were transitioned to ACIR's replacement pop format, Match.

References

Radio stations in Sinaloa
Grupo ACIR